Nepeta subsessilis, the short-stalked catmint, is a species of flowering plant in the mint family Lamiaceae, from Japan.
with fresh, aromatic green leaves and soft blue flowers in summer and autumn. It is more compact and erect, with larger flowers, than other members of Nepeta. It may also have a similar effect on cats.

References

Flora of Japan
subsessilis
Plants described in 1875